Tony Johnson (born 29 August 1959) is a New Zealand rugby commentator and presenter for SKY Television.

Johnson hailed from Picton and played for the Queen Charlotte College 1st XV as a lock and loose forward before playing club senior reserves. He also played premier cricket, basketball, golf and participated in swimming.

He suffers from peripheral neuropathy after first noticing a sore hip when he was in his late teens. That developed to weakness in his left leg and arm in his early 20s. Johnson was made to give up sport but was always captivated by radio. He started his broadcasting career in Blenheim in 1978 before stints in Wellington and Dunedin. After this, he was a reporter for Radio New Zealand in Europe and moved back to New Zealand in the early 1990s to work for Newstalk ZB to become the sports editor and radio rugby commentator. 

He was a sports presenter for TV3 in the mid-1990s while continuing to commentate rugby for radio before making the switch to SKY Television in 1999 when SKY increased their rugby coverage and needed more commentators and presenters.

Johnson has been to every Rugby World Cup, excluding the 1999 and 2019 tournament, as a fan, reporter or broadcaster, and has covered the Commonwealth Games in his capacity as a radio and television reporter.

Johnson is now a highly respected commentator during New Zealand's coverage of Super Rugby and the Mitre10 Cup during the winter and regional, national and a handful of international sevens competitions throughout the summer. He has commentated a handful of All Black test matches – as SKY's main commentator is Grant Nisbett but mainly hosts the pre and post-match shows and appears as the sideline commentator as well. He was a commentator during the 2011 Rugby World Cup and 2015 Rugby World Cup for host broadcaster SKY and ITV respectively.

He covered equestrian for SKY during the 2012 Commonwealth Games coverage and sevens for the 2020 Tokyo Olympics.

He also hosted a weekly Tuesday evening rugby analytical show Re-Union for over a decade before that was replaced by the shortened Sunday highlights show Rugby Nation screened on Prime TV and SKY in 2014. Johnson has contributed to Newstalk ZB's sports feature on a Monday morning with Mike Hosking and Andrew Saville and often appears on the weekend sports show. He appears on other radio networks as a guest contributor and a well-thought after guest speaker at events.

Johnson was the co-author of the book Behind the Silver Fern - The Players Speak with Lynn McConnell.

He revealed in a YouTube video he suffered from prostate cancer in 2019.

Johnson currently resides in the Auckland suburb of Northcote with his wife and daughter.

References

https://www.odt.co.nz/sport/other-sport/johnson-jumping-back-olympic-coverage 
https://soundcloud.com/newzealandbroadcastingschool/but-you-dont-look-sick-episode-3-chronic-health-and-following-your-passion
https://www.gettyimages.co.nz/detail/news-photo/sky-tv-commentator-tony-johnson-interviews-all-black-news-photo/72821065?adppopup=true
https://www.stuff.co.nz/entertainment/tv-radio/128694708/why-sky-sport-commentator-tony-johnson-doesnt-drop-the-ball-when-it-comes-to-rugby
https://www.youtube.com/watch?v=xsNlnz7wJwY&ab_channel=SkySportNZ

1959 births
New Zealand television journalists
Living people
People educated at Queen Charlotte College
People from Picton, New Zealand